Kilimnik is a surname. Notable people with the surname include:

Karen Kilimnik (born 1955), American painter and installation artist
Konstantin Kilimnik (born 1970), Russian-Ukrainian political consultant